Sedoheptulose 7-phosphate is an intermediate in the pentose phosphate pathway.

It is formed by transketolase and acted upon by transaldolase.

Sedoheptulokinase is an enzyme that uses sedoheptulose and ATP to produce ADP and sedoheptulose 7-phosphate.

Sedoheptulose-bisphosphatase is an enzyme that uses sedoheptulose 1,7-bisphosphate and H2O to produce sedoheptulose 7-phosphate and phosphate.

See also 
 Sedoheptulose
 3-Deoxy-D-arabino-heptulosonic acid 7-phosphate, a related compound and an intermediate in the biosynthesis of shikimic acid

References 

Organophosphates
Monosaccharide derivatives
Heptoses